Premio Lo Nuestro 2010 was held on Thursday February 18, 2010 at the American Airlines Arena in Miami, FL was broadcast live on the Univision Network. The nominees were announced in December 2009 during a live televised morning show Despierta América! on Univision Network. This year marked the first time the awards are presented in High Definition.

Performers

Presenters

 Natalia Jiménez
 William Levy
 Jacqueline Bracamontes
 Eiza González
 Franco "El Gorila"
 El Chapo de Sinaloa
 Luz Rios
 Carolina Tejera
 Arcángel
 Gloria Estefan
 Melina León
 Eddy Herrera
 Jose Luis Terrazas Jr.
 Fabian Muro

 Christian Chávez
 Carolina la O
 Marjorie de Sousa
 Gabriel Soto
 Lili Estefan
 Carlos & Alejandra
 Wisin & Yandel
 Don Francisco
 Miguel Galindo
 René Camacho
 Luis Fonsi
 Aleks Syntek
 Tati
 Diana Reyes
 Raúl González

Special awards

Lifetime Achievement Award
Chayanne

Special Career Achievement Award
Alejandro Fernández

Young Artist Legacy Award
Thalía

Awards

General

Pop

Album of the Year
 Ricardo Arjona — 5to Piso
 Fanny Lu — Dos
 Cristian Castro — El Culpable Soy Yo
 Paulina Rubio — Gran City Pop
 La 5ª Estación — Sin Frenos

Best Male Artist
 Cristian Castro
 Enrique Iglesias
 Luis Fonsi
 Ricardo Arjona
 Tommy Torres

Best Female Artist
 Fanny Lu
 Gloria Trevi
 Laura Pausini
 Nelly Furtado
 Paulina Rubio

Best Group or Duo
 Jesse & Joy
 La 5ª Estación
 Los Temerarios
 Playa Limbo
 Reik

Breakout Artist or Group of the Year
 Alexander Acha
 Nelly Furtado
 Sonohra
 Tati
 Victor & Leo

Song of the Year
 Luis Fonsi featuring Aleks Syntek, David Bisbal and Noel Schajris — "Aquí Estoy Yo"
 Playa Limbo — "Así Fue"
 Paulina Rubio — "Causa y Efecto"
 Ricardo Arjona — "Como Duele"
 La 5ª Estación — "Que te Quería"

Rock

Album of the Year
 La Secta AllStar — Fuego Los Fabulosos Cadillacs — La Luz del Ritmo
 Moderatto — Queremos Rock
 Zoé — Reptilectric

Artist of the Year
 Beto Cuevas
 Juanes La Secta AllStar
 Maná
 Motel

Song of the Year
 Los Rufianes — "Dame Tu Corazón"
 La Secta AllStar — "Déjalos Que Hablen"
 Beto Cuevas — "Hablame" Vivanativa — "Mariposa Mía"
 Los Fabulosos Cadillacs — "Should I Stay or Should I Go"

Tropical

Album of the Year
 15 Años de Corazon - Grupo Manía
 Ciclos - Luis Enrique
 El Mensaje - Rey Ruiz
 La Introduccion - Carlos & Alejandra
 The Last - AventuraBest Male Artist
 Domenic Marte
 Fonseca
 Gilberto Santa Rosa
 Hector Acosta
 Luis EnriqueBest Female Artist
 Carolina la O Marala
 Melina LeónBest Group or Duo
 Adolescent's Orquesta
 Aventura Carlos & Alejandra
 Grupo Manía
 Jorge Celedón and Jimmy Zambrano

Soloist or Group Revelation of the Year
 Carlos & Alejandra Grupo Rush
 Indio
 Marcy Place
 Rafely Rosario

Song of the Year
 "Eres Asi" - Domenic Marte
 "Llego el Amor" - Gilberto Santa Rosa
 "Marialola" - Grupo Manía
 "Por Un Segundo" - Aventura "Yo No Sé Mañana" - Luis Enrique

Merengue Artist of the Year
 Eddy Herrera
 Elvis Crespo
 Grupo Manía
 Juan Luis Guerra Rafely Rosario

Tropical Salsa Artist of the Year
 Adolescent's Orquesta
 Charlie Cruz
 Gilberto Santa Rosa
 Jerry Rivera
 Luis EnriqueTropical Traditional Artist of the Year
 Aventura Domenic Marte
 Fonseca
 Hector Acosta
 Jorge Celedón and Jimmy Zambrano

Regional Mexican Music

Album of the Year
 Más Adelante - La Arrolladora Banda El Limón
 Nosotros Somos - Montéz de Durango
 Para Siempre - El Chapo de Sinaloa
 Sólo Contigo - Pesado
 Te Presumo - Banda el RecodoMale Artist of the Year
 El Chapo de Sinaloa
 Espinoza Paz
 Germán Montero
 Marco Antonio Solís
 Vicente Fernández

Female Artist of the Year
 Alicia Villarreal
 Diana Reyes
 Jenni Rivera Luz Rios
 Paquita la del Barrio

Group or Duo of the Year
 Alacranes Musical
 Banda el Recodo
 Dareyes de la Sierra
 Montéz de Durango
 La Arrolladora Banda El LimónSong of the Year
 "El Último Beso" - Vicente Fernández
 "Lo Intentamos" - Espinoza Paz
 "Quiéreme Más" - Patrulla 81
 "Te Presumo" - Banda el Recodo
 "Ya Es Muy Tarde" - La Arrolladora Banda El Limón

Duranguense Artist of the Year
 Alacranes Musical
 El Trono de México
 Montéz de Durango
 K-Paz de la Sierra
 Patrulla 81

Banda of the Year
 Banda el Recodo
 Dareyes de la Sierra
 El Chapo de Sinaloa
 Espinoza Paz
 La Arrolladora Banda El Limón

Norteño Artist of the Year
 Conjunto Primavera
 Intocable
 Los Inquietos del Norte
 Los Tucanes de Tijuana
 Pesado

Grupera Artist of the Year
 Control
 Huichol Musical
 La Nobleza de Aguililla
 Los Pikadientes de Caborca
 Marco Antonio Solís

Ranchera Artist of the Year
 Diego Verdaguer
 Pedro Fernández
 Pepe Aguilar
 Vicente Fernández

Urban

Album of the Year
 Down to Earth - Alexis & Fido
 El Patrón - Tito El Bambino
 La Evolución Romantic Style - Flex
 Te Amo - Makano
 Wisin & Yandel Presentan: La Mente Maestra - DJ Nesty (featuring Wisin & Yandel)

Artist of the Year
 Daddy Yankee
 Flex
 R.K.M & Ken-Y
 Tito El Bambino
 Wisin & Yandel

Revelation of the Year
 Arcángel
 De La Ghetto
 Franco "El Gorila"
 Makano
 Yomo

Song of the Year
 "All Up 2 You" - Aventura (featuring Akon & Wisin & Yandel)
 "Dime Si Te Vas Con Él" - Flex
 "El Amor" - Tito El Bambino
 "Me Estás Tentando" - Wisin & Yandel
 "¿Qué Tengo Que Hacer?" - Daddy Yankee

Video

Video of the Year
 La Perla - Calle 13 (featuring Rubén Blades)
 Esclavo de Sus Besos - David Bisbal
 Recuérdame - La 5ª Estación (featuring Marc Anthony)
 Loco Por Ti - Los Temerarios
 Cumbayá - Pee Wee
 Loba - Shakira

References

External links
 Univision Press Release Premio Lo Nuestro 2010
 Univision Press Release Premio Lo Nuestro 2010a

Lo Nuestro Awards by year
2010 music awards
2010 in Latin music
2010s in Miami
2010 in Florida